Bruno Giovanni Quidaciolu may refer to two American actors:

Bruno Giovanni Quidaciolu, Sr. (1925–2021), known as Bruce Kirby (actor)
Bruno Giovanni Quidaciolu, Jr. (1949–2006), his son, known as Bruno Kirby